Ancient ubiquitous protein 1 is a protein that in humans is encoded by the AUP1 gene.

Function 

This gene encodes a protein that contains a domain with homology to the ancient conserved region of the archain 1 gene and a domain that may be involved in binding ubiquitin-conjugating enzymes. The protein encoded by this gene has been shown to bind to the conserved membrane-proximal sequence of the cytoplasmic tail of integrin alpha (IIb) subunits. These subunits play a crucial role in the integrin alpha (IIb) beta (3) inside-out signalling in platelets and megakaryocytes that leads to platelet aggregation and thrombus formation. This gene overlaps the gene for mitochondrial serine protease 25.

Interactions 

AUP1 has been shown to interact with ITGA2B.

References

External links

Further reading